The Pago Pago Stakes is an Australian Turf Club Group 3 Thoroughbred horse race, for two-year-old colts and geldings, at set weights, over a distance of 1200 metres, held annually at Rosehill Racecourse in Sydney, Australia in March. Total prize money for the race is A$200,000.

History
The following thoroughbreds have captured the Pago Pago – Golden Slipper double: Inspired (1984), Rory's Jester (1985), Stratum (2005), Shinzo (2023).

Name
The race is named after champion two year old Pago Pago the first interstate winner (from South Australia) of the Golden Slipper Stakes in 1963.

1978–1984 - Pago Pago Quality Handicap
 1985 - Pago Pago Quality Stakes
1986–2004 - Pago Pago Stakes
 2005–2009 - Darley Stakes
2010 onwards -  Pago Pago Stakes

Grade

1978 - Principal Race
1979 - Listed Race
1980–1986 - Group 3
1987–2016 - Group 2
2017 - Group 3

Winners

 2023 - Shinzo 
 2022 - Rise Of The Masses 
 2021 - Shaquero 
 2020 - Prague 
 2019 - Cosmic Force 
 2018 - Written By 
 2017 - Single Bullet 
 2016 - Souchez 
 2015 - Tarquin 
 2014 - Time For War
 2013 - Sidestep
 2012 - All Too Hard
 2011 - Salade
 2010 - Brightexpectations
 2009 - Tickets
 2008 - Sidereus
 2007 - Deferential
 2006 - Tarleton
 2005 - Stratum
 2004 - Genius And Evil
 2003 - Danbird
 2002 - Planchet
 2001 - Red Hannigan
 2000 - De France
 1999 - Shogun Lodge
 1998 - Paris Dream
 1997 - Encounter
 1996 - Babu's Boy
 1995 - Strategic
 1994 - Lord Jim
 1993 - Jetball
 1992 - Yachtie
 1991 - Big Dreams
 1990 - Pagan Jest
 1989 - Straussbrook
 1988 - Zeditave
 1987 - Christmas Tree
 1986 - Imperial Baron
 1985 - Rory's Jester
 1984 - Inspired
 1983 - Te Puninga
 1982 - Grosvenor
 1981 - Lead Role
 1980 - John's Hero
 1979 - Dawn Command
 1978 - Cheval De Volee

See also
 List of Australian Group races
 Group races

External links
 First three placegetters Pago Pago Stakes (ATC)

References

Horse races in Australia